Nothoceratidae is a family of nautiloid cephalopods in the orthoceratoid order Oncocerida in which shells are exogastrically or endogastrically breviconic, planospiral, or torticonic; often with a constricted or visored aperture; and a siphuncle commonly composed of concave segments and occupied by actinosiphonate deposits. Some ten genera have been described which lived during the time between the Early Silurian and Late Devonian.  The ancestral form is probably Perimecoceras which is known from the Upper Silurian of central Europe and which is similar in external form the Oonoceras from the Oncoceratidae.

Genera

Blakeoceras
Bolloceras
Conostichoceras
Cyrthoceratites
Lorieroceras
Metaphragmoceras
Mutoblakeoceras
Nothoceras
Paraconradoceras
Perimecoceras
Tafilaltoceras
Turnoceras

References

 Sweet, W. C. 1964; Nautiloidea -Oncocerida; Treatise on Invertebrate Paleontology, Part K; Geological Society of America and University of Kansas press; Teichert and Moore (eds)

Prehistoric nautiloid families
Llandovery first appearances
Late Devonian animals
Late Devonian extinctions
Oncocerida